Bella is a Ugandan drama film directed by Matt Bish and stars Cinderella Sanyu in her debut film acting role as Bella. It also stars Abby Mukiibi Nkaaga, Matthew Nabwiso, Simon Base Kalema, Roger Mugisha, Stellah Nantumbwe, Joel Okuyo Atiku, Michael Wawuyo Jr, Ba3shir. The film premiered at Victoria Hall, Kampala Serena Hotel in October 2017.

Summary
Bella tells the story of a homeless girl with a great singing talent who one day crosses paths with a music promoter and her life changes for the better. Bella is played by newcomer actress Cinderella Sanyu, an experienced singer who has been singing since the early 2000s.

Reception
The film received numerous nominations at the Uganda Film Festival Awards in 2018 including Best Feature Film, Best Actress, Best Screenplay and Best Cinematography among others. The however won only one award, Best Supporting Actress award received by Stellah Nantumbwe. Cindy also received a nomination at the Africa Movie Academy Awards in Nigeria for Best Young Actor and at the Nigeria Entertainment Awards for Best Africa Lead Actor (Non Nigerian), both for her role as Bella. The film also received two nominations at the 6th Africa Magic Viewers Choice Awards

Awards & Nominations

References

2017 films
2010s English-language films

External links